Clifford Charles Hutton (27 July 1887 – 31 May 1965) was an Australian rules footballer who played with Fitzroy and Richmond in the Victorian Football League (VFL).

Family
The son of Frederick Henry Hutton (1851-1894), and Arthena Hutton (1859-1944), née Coulton, Clifford Charles Hutton was born in Collingwood, Victoria on 27 July 1887.

Football

Fitzroy (VFL)
He made his debut, as one of the seven new players for Fitzroy — i.e., Ernie Everett, Jack Furness, Cliff Hutton, Frank Lamont, 
Tom Moloughney, Danny Murphy, and Eric Watson<ref>[http://nla.gov.au/nla.news-article142943520 League Matches, The Australasian, (Saturday, 6 May 1911), p.23.]</ref> — against Melbourne on 29 April 1911.

 Notes 

References
 Hogan P: The Tigers Of Old, Richmond FC, (Melbourne), 1996. 
 
 Photograph: The Fitzroy Football Team, The Leader, (Saturday, 11 May 1912), p.27.

 External links 

 "Hutton, _Ncte09", at The VFA Project.
 Cliff Hutton, at Boyles Football Photos''.

1887 births
1965 deaths
Australian rules footballers from Melbourne
Fitzroy Football Club players
Richmond Football Club players
Northcote Football Club players
People from Collingwood, Victoria